Marie François Xavier Henry Bouchot (26 September 1849, Beure - 10 October 1906, Paris) was a French art historian and conservator.

Biography 
Born to a modest family, his father died when he was only ten, and they moved to Besançon. He served in the Franco-Prussian War, with the Armée de l'Est. When he was twenty-five, he became a student at the École Nationale des Chartes, where he obtained a diploma as a Archivist-paleographer in 1878, with his thesis on the history of Vitry-le-François.

He became an assistant librarian in 1885, and wrote several studies of old prints. That same year, he married Claire Chevalier. They had a son, Jean (1886-1932), a conservator at the Musée de Besançon, and a daughter, a professor at the École du Louvre and wife of the sculptor, Georges Saupique.

In 1898, he succeeded Georges Duplessis as conservator at the Département des Estampes. Two years later, he was named a Knight in the Legion of Honor, for his role in organizing the Exposition Universelle. Then, in 1904, he was elected to the Académie des Beaux-Arts, where he took Seat #10 in the "Unattached" section.

His death came suddenly. A street in Beure has been named after him. A bust on a pedestal, by Armand Bloch, was dedicated in Besançon in 1907. in a square that bears his name.

References

Further reading 
 Georges Grazier: "Henri Bouchot", in: Mémoires de la Société d'Émulation du Doubs, 8th series, Vol.1, 1906, (Full text)
  also   .
  also .
 Antoine Thomas and Henri-François Delaborde, "Henri Bouchot", in: Bibliothèque de l'école des chartes, 1906, vol.67, pp.574–578 (Full text)

External links 

 Works by Bouchot @ the Internet Archive
 Works by Bouchot @ the Online Books Page

1849 births
1906 deaths
19th-century French historians
École Nationale des Chartes alumni
People from Doubs
Members of the Académie des beaux-arts